Flint Group is a manufacturing company with its headquarters in Luxembourg. Having a revenue of US$2.3 billion and about 7,900 employees, Flint Group is one of the largest suppliers to the printing and packaging and labeling industries worldwide. Flint Group operates 180 sites in 40 countries across the globe.

History 
Flint Group’s history is characterised by mergers and acquisitions. The company combined four businesses that together cover nearly the complete range of packaging and print media print consumables. In 2004, CVC Capital acquired ANI, an ink producer that was previously a business unit of Akzo Nobel and BASF Printing Systems, a business unit of BASF, and combined both companies.

The acquisition of Flint Ink Corporation, a US supplier of printing ink and colorants, in late 2005, resulted in the formation of Flint Group. In 2007, Flint Group acquired Day International, Inc., a manufacturer of consumable image-transfer products and press room chemicals for the packaging and print media industries, which supplemented Flint Group’s existing product line and increased its global position in the non-ink press room consumables market. From 2015 the company also owns Xeikon a leading developer of digital colour presses. In the same year Flint Group Africa was formed with a majority shareholding along with Continental Inks in South Africa. In the US Flint Group acquired American Inks & Coatings, Printec and Advanced Colour System in 2016, in the UK, FG also added Druckfarben to the portfolio.

References

External links
 

Companies based in Luxembourg City
Manufacturing companies established in 1920
1920 establishments in Luxembourg
Holding companies established in 1920